Santa is an unincorporated community in Benewah County, Idaho, United States. Santa has a post office with ZIP code 83866. The town changed its name to SecretSanta.com for a year, in 2005 to promote the website and to get at least $20,000.

History
A post office called Santa has been in operation since 1887. The community took its name from nearby Santa Anna Creek.

References

Unincorporated communities in Benewah County, Idaho
Unincorporated communities in Idaho